Bird People is a 2014 French drama film directed by Pascale Ferran and starring Josh Charles and Anaïs Demoustier. It was screened in the Un Certain Regard section at the 2014 Cannes Film Festival. It was also screened in the Contemporary World Cinema section at the 2014 Toronto International Film Festival.

Plot
University student Audrey Camuzet works in Paris as a hotel maid where Gary Newman, an American businessman from Silicon Valley, is staying. The night after his meeting, Gary has difficulty sleeping and suffers a panic attack. When morning arrives, he stays in his room, deliberately misses his flight to Dubai where he had further business. He decides to quit his job, divorce his wife Elizabeth, leave his family and remain in the hotel indefinitely.

Audrey tidies Gary's room after initially being surprised to find that he had not yet departed and discovers he was supposed to already be in Dubai. When the hotel experiences an electrical blackout, she goes to the roof to investigate and transforms into a sparrow. She glides down to the ground, overhears other people's conversations, practices her new found flying abilities and peeps into various hotel rooms. After checking on Gary, she returns to the hotel roof and finds herself unable to return to her human form.

That night, she follows coworker Simon in his car to a park where he sleeps. After escaping attacks by a cat and an owl, she returns to the hotel roof. In the morning, she awakens in her original form once again. Later, Audrey literally bumps into Gary as he checks out of the hotel. They share an elevator ride and a conversation.

Cast
 Josh Charles as Gary Newman
 Anaïs Demoustier as Audrey Camuzet
 Roschdy Zem as Simon
 Camélia Jordana as Leila
 Geoffrey Cantor as Allan 
 Clark Johnson as McCullan
 Akela Sari as Mme Baccar
 Anne Azoulay as Melle Lhomond
 Manuel Vallade as Boris
 Genevieve Adams as Katlyn
 Taklyt Vongdara as Akira 
 Radha Mitchell as Elisabeth Newman
 Catherine Ferran as Nuala
 Hippolyte Girardot as Vengers
 Mathieu Amalric as The Narrator
 Philippe Duclos as Audrey's father (voice)
 Kate Moran as Gary's sister (voice)

References

External links
 

2014 films
2014 drama films
2010s fantasy drama films
2010s French-language films
French fantasy drama films
2010s English-language films
Films directed by Pascale Ferran
2010s French films